, also known as Battle Vixens in North America, is a Japanese manga series written and illustrated by Yūji Shiozaki. The story centers on Hakufu Sonsaku, a fighter who transfers to Nanyo Academy, one of the seven schools involved in the turf war.

The manga was serialized in the seinen manga magazine Comic Gum from April 2000 to August 2015, and the first tankōbon was released in October 2000, with a total of 24 volumes available as of September 2015. The manga was licensed in North America and the United Kingdom by Tokyopop with adaptation from Keith Giffen under the title Battle Vixens, and in Australia and New Zealand by Madman Entertainment. A sequel manga titled Shin Ikki Tousen began serialization in Shōnen Gahōsha's Young King OURs magazine in November 2015.

A 13-episode anime television series adaptation animated by J.C.Staff aired between July and October 2003, on AT-X and other channels. A second anime season animated by Arms aired on AT-X between February and May 2007, spanning twelve episodes. A third anime season, also animated by Arms, aired on AT-X between June and August 2008, spanning twelve episodes and featuring an original story and characters. A fourth anime season animated by TNK aired on AT-X and other channels between March and June 2010, spanning 12 episodes and introducing new schools and characters. An anime OVA was announced by Media Factory, and premiered in Japanese theaters on November 12, 2011. A three-episode anime television series adaptation of Shin Ikki Tousen, once again animated by Arms, aired on AT-X in May 2022.

The first anime season was licensed in North America by Geneon Entertainment, but it is now licensed by Funimation after Geneon withdrew from the anime market. The second anime season is licensed in North America by Media Blasters. The third anime season was also licensed by Media Blasters, but it is now licensed by Funimation. The fourth anime season is also licensed by Funimation.

Synopsis

In the Kantō region of Japan, seven high schools compete in a turf war for territorial supremacy: Nanyo Academy, Kyosho Academy, Seito Academy, Yoshu Academy, Rakuyo High School, Gogun High School, and Yoshu Private School. The fighters of each school bear the sacred jewels called magatama, which contains the essence of warriors from the Three Kingdoms era of Ancient China 1800 years ago, as well as their fates.

Hakufu Sonsaku, the descendant of legendary conqueror Sun Ce, is a highly skilled fighter with a strong sense of personality who goes to Nanyo Academy where her cousin Koukin Shuuyu attends under her mother's request. Her destiny, as with her predecessor, was to conquer all of the schools. But there is a darker and more dangerous side to her fate, one that may change the entire course of history forever.

Media

Manga

Ikki Tousen began serialization in the seinen manga magazine Comic GUM. The first bound volume was published by Wani Books in October 2000, with a total of 24 volumes available as of September 25, 2015. The manga was licensed in North America and the United Kingdom by Tokyopop under the title of Battle Vixens, and sold fifteen volumes between April 6, 2004 and April 27, 2010. The manga is also licensed in Australia and New Zealand by Madman Entertainment, in France by Panini Comics, in Argentina and Spain by Editorial Ivrea, in Germany by Carlsen Comics (under the title of Dragon Girls), in Taiwan by Sharp Point Press, in Brazil by Nova Sampa.

In October 2015, Shōnen Gahōsha announced that the sequel Shin Ikki Tousen would be serialized in Young King OURs magazine starting in its January 2016 issue released on November 30, 2015.

Anime

A 13-episode anime adaptation of Ikki Tousen animated by J.C.Staff and directed by Takashi Watanabe aired on AT-X from July 30, 2003 and October 22, 2003, with subsequent runs on TV Kanagawa, Mie TV, Chiba TV, TV Saitama, and Sun Television. Seven DVD volumes were released by Media Factory between November 22, 2003 and May 25, 2004. A DVD box set was later released on January 25, 2008, and a Blu-ray box set was later released on April 27, 2011. The series was licensed in North America by Geneon Entertainment, who released the series on four DVD volumes between August 10, 2004 and March 1, 2005. The English dub was produced by New Generation Pictures in Los Angeles, California. A box set was later released on July 19, 2005 by Geneon. The series is now licensed by Funimation after Geneon closed its doors to the North American market, and released a box set of the series on May 26, 2009. The series is also licensed in Australia and New Zealand by Madman Entertainment, and in the United Kingdom by MVM Films.

A second season, called , animated by Arms and directed by Koichi Ohata, aired 12 episodes on AT-X from February 26, 2007 to May 14, 2007, with subsequent broadcasts on Chiba TV, KBS Kyoto, TV Kanagawa, Tokyo MX, Sun Television, TV Aichi, and TV Saitama. Six DVD volumes were released by Media Factory between July 25 and November 22, 2007, each volume containing an original video animation called , featuring the female cast in a hot spring setting. A DVD boxset was later released on December 22, 2009. The anime is licensed in North America by Media Blasters, who released the series on three DVD volumes between November 24, 2009 and April 20, 2010. Unlike the first season, the English dub for Dragon Destiny was recorded at Headline Studios in Irvington, New York. A box set was later released on August 31, 2010. The anime is also licensed in Australia by Madman Entertainment, as with the first season. However, due to the series' violent and sexual scenes, the Office of Film and Literature Classification banned Ikki Tousen: Dragon Destiny in New Zealand.

A third season, animated by Arms and directed by Koichi Ohata, aired 12 episodes on AT-X from June 11, 2008 to August 27, 2008, with subsequent broadcasts on Chiba TV, TV Saitama, TV Aichi, TV Kanagawa, Sun Television, and Tokyo MX. The series features an all-new storyline featuring Chokyo, Hakufu's younger sister and the Japanese counterpart of Xiao Qiao, introducing another Genpou Saji as an antagonist, and the return of a character who previously died in the first series. Six DVD compilation volumes were released by Media Factory between September 25, 2008 and February 25, 2009, each volume containing an original video animation called . A DVD box set was released on March 25, 2010. The series was also licensed by Media Blasters, as with the second season, and was scheduled to be released in a complete box set on March 31, 2012. The series was originally planned to be released in two half-series sets on August 30, 2011 and October 25, 2011, respectively, prior to its rescheduled date. Media Blasters later announced on February 3, 2012 that the North American release of Great Guardians was placed on an indefinite hold. At Anime Expo 2012, Funimation announced that they had acquired the licensing rights to Great Guardians. Funimation released the DVD box-set of Great Guardians on December 31, 2013. The English dub for the third season was once again produced by New Generation Pictures whom not only recorded the original voice actors in California, but also managed to get several voice actors from Dragon Destiny to record in New York at DuArt Film and Video. On January 3, 2014, Madman Entertainment had release the series on Blu-ray on March 19, 2014.

A fourth season, called , was announced. Animated by TNK and directed by Koichi Ohata, the series aired twelve episodes on AT-X between March 26 and June 11, 2010, with subsequent broadcasts on Chiba TV, TV Kanagawa, TV Saitama, Tokyo MX, TV Aichi, and Sun Television. The series introduces two new schools, Nanban High School and Ryoshu Academy, and introduces Kentei, the Japanese counterpart of Emperor Xian, as an antagonist. Six DVD and Blu-ray volumes were released by Media Factory between June 25 and November 25, 2010. The DVD/BDs contains an original video animation called . At Anime Expo 2012, Funimation announced that they had also acquired the licensing rights to Xtreme Xecutor alongside Great Guardians. Funimation released the DVD box-set of Xtreme Xecutor on March 11, 2014 in North America. As with the third season, the English dub was produced by both New Generation Pictures and DuArt Film and Video in California and New York, respectively.

An original video animation, called  was announced by Media Factory, and a promotional video was posted on their YouTube channel. The OVA was released in Japanese theaters on November 12, 2011. It was later released on DVD and Blu-ray on February 22, 2012 by Media Factory. Funimation released the DVD box-set of Great Guardians on December 31, 2013. Funimation included the OVA as part of their Xtreme Xecutor DVD Box Set in North America.

A 3-episode OVA titled Ikki Tousen: Western Wolves was released between January 3, 2019 to February 27, 2019. The anime's director is Takashi Watanabe, while Masaya Honda returns as series composition.

An anime television series adaptation of Shin Ikki Tousen was announced on July 2, 2021. It is produced by Arms and directed by Rion Kujo, with scripts written by Masaya Honda, character designs handled by Rin-Sin and Tsutomu Miyazawa, and music composed by Yasuharu Takanashi. The series aired on AT-X from May 17 to 31, 2022, and ran for three episodes.

The opening theme for the first season is "Drivin' Through The Night" by M.o.v.e, and there are two ending themes, "Let me be with you" by Shela from episodes 1–7, and "Fate" by Masumi Asano (the original voice of Hakufu Sonsaku) for episodes 8-13. The opening theme for the OVA is "FATE ～on the way～" by MAI & AMI. The theme song for Shin Ikki Tousen is "Proud Stars" by Konomi Suzuki.

Internet radio show
An internet radio show promoting the Dragon Destiny anime called  was produced by Media Factory and aired on MediaFac Radio between November 25, 2006 and aired 31 episodes. The show was hosted by Masumi Asano and Hitomi Nabatame, the voices of Hakufu and Kanu, respectively. A CD of the radio show was released by Media Factory on June 27, 2007.

Another radio show promoting Great Guardians called , also produced by Media Factory, aired on MediaFac Radio between March 26, 2008 and March 2009, spanning 23 episodes. Masumi Asano and Hitomi Nabatame reprise their host roles as Hakufu and Kanu. A CD of the show was released by Media Factory on March 25, 2009.

A radio show promoting Xtreme Xecutor called  aired on HiBiKi Radio Station between December 25, 2009 and December 3, 2010, spanning 41 episodes. Like the last two radio shows, the show was hosted by Masumi Asano and Hitomi Nabatame reprising their respective roles as Hakufu and Kanu.

Video games
A video game of the series, was developed by Idea Factory and released for the PlayStation 2 in Japan on July 26, 2007 by Marvelous Entertainment. The game has an original storyline with Hakufu, Ryomou, and Kanu as the main playable characters. The game introduces a new character named Chousen, the Japanese counterpart of Diao Chan. Along with Hakufu, Ryomou, and Kanu, Ryubi, Ukitsu, Chouhi, Choun, Ryofu, and Kakoen also appear as playable characters, with Shuyu appearing as an extra character in Hakufu and Ryomou's story arcs respectively. The game's international release was completed by 2008 but formally cancelled by the distributor in May 2009, with the M rating being listed as the most damaging factor.

A second video game, was developed by Tamsoft for the PlayStation Portable and released on October 2, 2008 by Marvelous Entertainment. The game is a hybrid between fighting and adventure, and it features 15 Ikki Tousen heroines and a new character named Kanpei, the Japanese counterpart of Guan Ping and the protagonist of the game. New characters include Sousou (Berserk Dragon Ruler Mode), Teni, Shokatsuryo, Ryubi, Saji, and Ouin, along with EX-Hakufu (Berserk Dragon Ruler Mode) and EX-Ryubi (whom technically is the non-Berserk Dragon Mode (as the Berserk Mode was a playable character in the first game)) (Shining Dragon). Eloquent Fist omits the presence of Ukitsu, and new finishing maneuvers and altered movesets have either been buffed, or have been nerfed.

A third installment based on the Xtreme Xecutor anime, called , was developed by Tamsoft for the PlayStation Portable and released on April 28, 2010 in Japan. It features a new character named Ato, the Japanese counterpart of Liu Shan along with the return of Ukitsu as a playable character, and Chinkyu, Bashoku, Kyocho, and Shibai are added as playable characters. The game adds a "Super Arts" bar, tag-team battles and combos, and the addition of the alternate striker system. The gameplay was also revamped to include an aerial pursuit rave and a Finishing Screen.

The characters Sonsaku, Kan'u and Ryofu made a DLC playable guest appearance in Senran Kagura: Estival Versus. However, due to a temporary licensing issue, these characters did not appear in the Western version of the game, until it was announced to be released along with the PC version of the game in March 2017.

The mobile game Ikki Tousen: Extra Burst was released in 2020 by Marvelous as a special project celebrating the 20th anniversary of the Ikki Tousen series.

Notes

See also

References

External links
Comic Gum page 
Tokyopop page

TV series/OVA
Official anime website 
J.C.Staff page 
Arms Corporation page: ITDD, ITGG, ITSTK
Geneon Entertainment page
Ikki Tousen at Funimation Entertainment
Ikki Tousen at MVM Films
Ikki Tousen at Madman Entertainment
Media Blasters page: IT, ITDD
Ikki Tousen at Enoki Films USA
Genco page: IT, ITDD, ITGG, ITXX

Video games
Official Ikki Tousen: Shining Dragon website 
Official Ikki Tousen: Eloquent Fist website 
Official Ikki Tousen: Xross Impact website 
Ikki Tousen Extra Burst website 

 
2000 manga
2003 anime television series debuts
2007 anime television series debuts
2007 video games
2008 anime television series debuts
2008 video games
2010 anime television series debuts
2010 video games
2011 anime OVAs
2014 anime OVAs
2019 anime OVAs
2022 anime television series debuts
Anime Works
Arms Corporation
AT-X (TV network) original programming
Fighting games
Funimation
Geneon USA
J.C.Staff
Japan-exclusive video games
Japanese LGBT-related animated television series
Kadokawa Dwango franchises
Madman Entertainment manga
Martial arts anime and manga
PlayStation 2 games
PlayStation Portable games
School life in anime and manga
Seinen manga
Sharp Point Press titles
Shōnen Gahōsha manga
TNK (company)
Tokyopop titles
Video games developed in Japan
Video games featuring female protagonists
Wani Books manga
Works based on Romance of the Three Kingdoms